The Great National Assembly (MAN) was the legislature of the Socialist Republic of Romania (known as the Romanian People's Republic before 1965). After the overthrow of Communism in Romania in December 1989, the Great National Assembly was dissolved by decree of the National Salvation Front (FSN) and eventually replaced by the bicameral parliament, made up of the Chamber of Deputies and the Senate.

The Great National Assembly was elected every four years and each individual member represented 60,000 citizens. The system was created to imitate the Soviet model.

Powers 

The MAN had the power to, among other things, amend the constitution and appoint and depose the Supreme Commander of the Romanian People's Army. The resolutions required a simple majority to be passed through.

The Assembly convened twice a year for ordinary sessions and for extraordinary sessions as many times as required by the State Council or by at least one third of the members of the Assembly. It elected its own chairmen and four deputies to preside each session.  On paper, it was the highest level of state power in Romania, and all other state organs were subordinate to it.  In practice, like all other Communist legislatures, it did little more than give legal sanction to decisions already made by the Romanian Communist Party (PCR).

Formally, the MAN gained in power over time.  The 1948 Constitution (article 39) granted it just eight powers; the 1952 Constitution (article 24), 10; the 1965 Constitution (article 43), 24.

Voters were presented with a single slate of candidates from an alliance dominated by the PCR—known as the People's Democratic Front from 1947 to 1968, the Socialist Unity Front from 1968 to 1980, and the Front of Socialist Unity and Democracy from 1980 to 1989. Since no one could run for office without Front approval, the Front—and through it, the PCR—effectively predetermined the composition of the Assembly.

When the Assembly was not in session, some of its powers were exercised by the State Council (which the Constitution defined as the MAN in permanent session), such as setting guidelines for the law and supervising the local councils.  It could also issue governmental regulations in lieu of law. If such regulation was not approved by the MAN at its next session, it was considered revoked.  However, under the principles of democratic centralism, such approval was merely a formality.  Combined with the MAN's infrequent sessions, this meant that State Council decisions de facto had the force of law.  In emergencies, the State Council assumed the MAN's powers to control the budget and economic plan, appoint and dismiss ministers and justices of the Supreme Court, mobilize the armed forces and declare war.

1980 elections 

According to the official results of the March 9, 1980, election, which elected 369 deputies, 99.99% of the registered voters cast their votes. Of them, 98.52% approved the Front list, 1.48% voted against and just 44 votes were declared invalid.

192 seats of the Assembly were occupied by women and 47 seats belonged to national minorities (mainly Hungarians and Germans).

Presidents of the Great National Assembly 

The "lower house" numbering continues from the numbering of presidents of the old Assembly of Deputies (1862–1948).

References 

Socialist Republic of Romania
Romania, Great National Assembly
1948 establishments in Romania
1989 disestablishments in Romania